Jawahar Ravirai Bakshi is a Gujarati poet from Gujarat, India.

Biography
Jawahar Bakshi was born on 19 February 1947 in Junagadh to Nilavati and Ravirai Bakshi. He completed his schooling from Swami Vivekanand Vinay Mandir. He completed Bachelor of Commerce from Sydenham College of Commerce and Economics in Bombay (now Mumbai) in 1964 and became a chartered accountant.

Bakshi wrote his first ghazal in 1959 and had written more than 700 ghazals. His ghazals explore spirituality. Tarapanana Shaherma (1999) and Parpotana Killa (2012) are his ghazal collections having 108 and 11 ghazals respectively. He has received prizes from Gujarati Sahitya Parishad and Gujarat Sahitya Akademi. He was awarded Narmad Suvarna Chandrak in 1998. He was also awarded Kalapi Award for his ghazals in 2006. He was awarded the Kavishwar Dalpatram Award for 2019.

Personal life 
Bakshi married Daksha and they have a daughter named Pooja.

See also
 List of Gujarati-language writers

References

External links
 

1947 births
Living people
Gujarati-language poets
Gujarati-language writers
Poets from Gujarat
20th-century Indian poets
21st-century Indian poets
Indian male poets
People from Junagadh
University of Mumbai alumni